Shanxi Reservoir, also known as Shansi Reservoir,  is a reservoir located in Shanxi Village, Jinsha Township, Kinmen County, Taiwan. Its water source is natural rainfall.

The construction of the Shanxi Reservoir started in March 1996 and was completed in September 1997. It has a catchment area of 0.88 square kilometers and a designed effective water storage capacity of about 220,000 cubic meters.

References

Buildings and structures in Taiwan
Buildings and structures completed in 1997
Geography of Kinmen County
Jinsha Township
Reservoirs in Taiwan